Evolvulus alsinoides, commonly known as dwarf morning-glory and slender dwarf morning-glory, is flowering plant from the family Convolvulaceae. It has a natural pantropical distribution encompassing tropical and warm-temperate regions of Australasia, Indomalaya, Polynesia, Sub-Saharan Africa and the Americas.

It was first described in 1753 by Carl Linnaeus as Convolvulus alsinoides. In 1762, he transferred it to the new genus, Evolvulus.

Description

It is a herbaceous plant, annual or perennial, with more or less numerous, prostrate or ascending stems, slender, with appressed and spreading hairs. The leaves, petiolate or subsessile, are 0.7 to 2.5 cm long and 5 to 10 mm long.

The flowers are isolated or grouped in pauciflorous cymes, borne by filiform peduncles, 2.5 to 3.5 cm long. The calyx is formed by villous, lanceolate sepals 3 to 4 mm long. The rounded corolla, with pentameric symmetry, blue in color, rarely white, is 7 to 10 mm in diameter. The stamens, with filiform filaments, are united at the base of the corolla tube. The ovary, glabrous, is surmounted by two free styles. The fruit is a globular capsule, with four valves, generally containing four seeds that are black and smooth.

Habitat
The species inhabits a wide range of habitats, from marshland and wet forests to deserts. A number of varieties and subspecies are recognised. It may become a weed in some situations. It is one of the plants included in Dasapushpam, the ten sacred flowers of Kerala.

Chemistry
This herb used in traditional medicine of East Asia for its purported psychotropic and nootropic properties. although such claims are not medically verified.

Chemical compounds isolated from E. alsinoides include scopoletin, umbelliferone, scopolin and 2-methyl-1,2,3,4-butanetetrol.

References

External links
 

alsinoides
Medicinal plants of Asia
Flora of Australia
Taxa named by Carl Linnaeus